Lady Rizo (aka Amelia Zirin-Brown) is an American singer, comedian and actress who began her career performing in New York City in 2004. She is featured on the gospel song "This Little Light of Mine" on Yo-Yo Ma's 2008 Christmas album Songs of Joy & Peace.

Career

In 2005, Amelia Zirin-Brown co-created the show "Lady Rizo and the Assettes" with Amber Star Merkens. The show drew from theater, vaudeville, burlesque, cabaret and performance art. Lady Rizo sang largely vintage arrangements of 1980s and 1990s pop songs. She has a solo residency at Joe's Pub entitled "Lady Rizo: Unescorted", that began in the winter of 2009.

She is featured on the track "Pale Horses" for Moby's album Wait for Me (as Zirin-Brown).

Zirin-Brown was featured on the gospel song "This Little Light of Mine" for Yo-Yo Ma's 2008 Christmas album Songs of Joy & Peace which won the Grammy Award for Best Classical Crossover Album in 2010. She also starred in Taylor Mac's five-hour show at HERE Arts Center, The Lily's Revenge.

Lady Rizo released her debut album Violet on November 19, 2013.  Her second album Indigo was released in late 2017.  The recording was completed in Royal Studios in Memphis, Tennessee.

Acting
As an actress she has collaborated with Tony Award winner Bartlett Sher in his 2001 production of Cymbeline and with Adam Rapp in Los Angeles at the Flea Theatre (for which she co-wrote the original score).  She is also featured in the 2013 film Joy de V.

Discography
 2013 Violet 
 2017 Indigo

with Moby
 2009 "Pale Horses" (as Amelia Zirin-Brown) on Moby's album Wait for Me

with Yo-Yo Ma
 2008 "This Little Light of Mine" (as Amelia Zirin-Brown) on Yo-Yo Ma's album Songs of Joy & Peace

References

External links

 

 Lady Rizo Official Site

Living people
American women singers
American neo-burlesque performers
Radical Faeries members
Year of birth missing (living people)
21st-century American women